Aeginina longicornis, the long-horned skeleton shrimp, is a species of amphipod in the family Caprellidae. The species is commonly found in the North Atlantic Ocean and provides extended parental care for their offspring, similar to other peracarid species.

References

Amphipoda
Crustaceans described in 1842